"Ho Halla" is an Indore Swachhta Anthem song for the 2017 edition of Swachh Survekshan (Cleanliness Survey), sung by Shaan, composed by Rishiking and conceived by Parikipandla Narahari, an IAS Officer serving as the district collector. The purpose of the song was to encourage the city of Indore to achieve the highest levels of cleanliness. It became very popular in Indore with residents using the track as their caller tunes.

Release 
The audio song was released on 30 December 2016 and received a positive critical reception as well as high popularity with Indore residents.

Success and impact 

Indore has become the number one city in India for cleanliness because of the residents, public representatives and government officials. But the credit for the changed mindset of the people has been accredited to the song "Ho Halla".

References

2017 songs
Indore